Hideous Kinky is an autobiographical novel by Esther Freud, daughter of British painter Lucian Freud and Bernardine Coverley and great-granddaughter of Sigmund Freud. It depicts the author's unconventional childhood in Morocco with her mother and her elder sister, Bella. In 1998, a film adaptation was released.

Plot summary
A young mother and her two daughters travel to Marrakech, Morocco, during the 1960s. The mother, Julia, is disenchanted by the dreary conventions of English life, hence the journey. They live in a low-rent Marrakech hotel and make a living out of sewing dresses and with some money sent by the girls' father, an artist in London.

Whilst the mother explores Sufism and quests for personal fulfilment, the daughters rebel. The elder, Bea, attempting to re-create her English life, wants to get an education and insists on going to school. The younger, Lucy, dreams of trivial things, like mashed potatoes, but also yearns for a father. Her hopes settle on a most unlikely candidate.

The girls match their mother with Bilal, a Moroccan acrobat; the relationship turns sexual and he moves in, becoming almost a surrogate father. However, Julia's friend encourages her to travel to Algiers and study with a Sufi master at a school that advocates the "annihilation of the ego." As money vanishes, Julia's response is to claim that "God will provide," albeit in the person of Bilal.

Film, TV or theatrical adaptations
In 1998, the novel was adapted into a film, Hideous Kinky, directed by Gillies MacKinnon.

Release details
 1992, UK, Hamish Hamilton , Pub date 30 January 1992, hardback (First edition)
 1992, USA, Harcourt , Pub date 1 July 1992, hardback
 1993, UK, Penguin Books , Pub date 25 February 1993, paperback
 1998, USA, W.W. Norton , Pub date ? April 1998, paperback
 1999, UK, CSA Word , Pub date ? January 1999, Audio book cassette (narrated by Esther Freud)
 1999, USA, ScreenPress Books , Pub date 11 March 1999, paperback (Film screenplay)

External links
 
 

1992 British novels
British autobiographical novels
English novels
British novels adapted into films
Novels set in Morocco
Novels set in the 1960s
1992 debut novels
Hamish Hamilton books